The salivatory nuclei are the superior salivatory nucleus, and the inferior salivatory nucleus that innervate the salivary glands. They are located in the pontine tegmentum in the brainstem. They both are examples of cranial nerve nuclei.

The superior salivatory nucleus innervates the submandibular gland and the sublingual gland and is part of the facial nerve

The inferior salivatory nucleus innervates the parotid gland by way of the otic ganglion and forms the parasympathetic component of the glossopharyngeal nerve.

Superior salivatory nucleus

The superior salivatory nucleus (or nucleus salivatorius superior) of the facial nerve is a visceromotor cranial nerve nucleus located in the pontine tegmentum. It is one of the salivatory nuclei.

Parasympathetic efferent fibers of the facial nerve (preganglionic fibers) arise according to some authors from the small cells of the facial nucleus, or according to others from a special nucleus of cells scattered in the reticular formation, dorso-medial to the facial nucleus – the superior salivatory nucleus.

Some of the preganglionic fibers travel along the greater petrosal nerve through the pterygoid canal, where they join the postsynaptic fibers of the deep petrosal nerve to become the nerve of the pterygoid canal. These fibers synapse in the pterygopalatine ganglion, whereupon the postganglionic, postsynaptic, efferent fibers travel to innervate the lacrimal gland and the mucosal glands of the nose, palate, and pharynx.

Preganglionic parasympathetic fibers are also distributed partly via the chorda tympani and lingual nerves to the submandibular ganglion, thence by postganglionic (vasodilator) fibers to the submandibular  and sublingual  salivary glands.

The term "lacrimal nucleus" is sometimes used to refer to a portion of the superior salivatory nucleus.

Inferior salivatory nucleus
The inferior salivatory nucleus (or nucleus salivatorius inferior) is a cluster of neurons in the pontine tegmentum (dorsal part of the pons), just above its junction with the medulla. It is the general visceral efferent (GVE) component of the glossopharyngeal nerve supplying the parasympathetic input to the parotid gland for salivation.

It lies immediately caudal to the superior salivatory nucleus and just above the upper end of the dorsal nucleus of the vagus nerve in the medulla.

The preganglionic parasympathetic fibres originate in the inferior salivatory nucleus of the glossopharyngeal nerve. They leave the glossopharyngeal nerve by its tympanic branch and then pass via the tympanic plexus and the lesser petrosal nerve to the otic ganglion. Here, the fibres synapse, and the postganglionic fibers pass by communicating branches to the auriculotemporal nerve, which conveys them to the parotid gland. They produce vasodilator and secretomotor effects.

Function
Parasympathetic input from fibers of the inferior salivatory nucleus stimulates the parotid gland to produce vasodilation and secrete saliva.

Additional images

References

Bibliography

External links
 
 Diagram (look for #3)
 Diagram
 Cluster Headache Pathogenesis
 
 https://web.archive.org/web/20060907231522/http://sprojects.mmi.mcgill.ca/cns/histo/systems/cranialnerves/main.htm

Pons